The Bunuban languages (or Bunaban) are a small family of Australian Aboriginal languages spoken in northern Australia. The family consists of two languages, Bunuba and Gooniyandi, which are related to each other to about the same degree that English is related to Dutch. Bunuba has about 100 speakers and Gooniyandi about 400. Both are endangered.

Vocabulary
Capell (1940) lists the following basic vocabulary items:

{| class="wikitable sortable" class="wikitable sortable"
! English
! Bunaba !! Gunian
|-
! man
|  || 
|-
! woman
|  || 
|-
! head
|  || 
|-
! eye
|  || 
|-
! nose
|  || 
|-
! mouth
|  || 
|-
! tongue
|  || 
|-
! stomach
|  || 
|-
! bone
|  || 
|-
! blood
|  || 
|-
! kangaroo
|  || 
|-
! opossum
|  || 
|-
! emu
|  || 
|-
! crow
|  || 
|-
! fly
|  || 
|-
! sun
|  || 
|-
! moon
|  || 
|-
! fire
|  || 
|-
! smoke
|  || 
|-
! water
|  || 
|}

References

 
Non-Pama-Nyungan languages
Language families
Indigenous Australian languages in Western Australia